Vladyslava Ruslanivna Lesnaya (born 16 June 1996) is a Ukrainian badminton player. She competed at the 2014 Summer Youth Olympics in Nanjing, China.

Achievements

BWF International Challenge/Series 
Women's doubles

  BWF International Challenge tournament
  BWF International Series tournament
  BWF Future Series tournament

References

External links 
 

Living people
1996 births
Sportspeople from Kharkiv
Ukrainian female badminton players
Badminton players at the 2014 Summer Youth Olympics
21st-century Ukrainian women